Dalian Shide Siwu Football Club was a Chinese professional football club which was formed to play as a foreign team in Singapore's S.League in 2008.

The club was a satellite team of the Chinese Super League club Dalian Shide. Players from Dalian Shide's reserve and youth team made up the majority of its S.League squad.

The team played their home games at the Queenstown Stadium.

As part of a sponsorship deal with Trump Dragon Distillers, Dalian Shide's Singapore team took on the name Dalian Shide Siwu FC.

In 2008, the club took over Liaoning Guangyuan FC's position in the S.League. The club aimed for a top-six finish in their first season in 2008 and also targeted for the league title by 2010.

In 2009, the Football Association of Singapore has decided not to invite them to participate in the S.League again, they were replaced by Brunei DPMM FC.

2008 Squad

Former technical staff 
 
 Team Manager: Liu Jiang Wei
 Head Coach: Pei Yong Jin

Seasons
As of the end of 2008 season

Sponsors 

 Main Sponsor: Trump Dragon Distillers
 Kit Supplier: Adidas

References

External links 
 S.League website page on Dalian Shide Siwu FC
 S.League 2008 Fixtures
 Chinese Super League side Dalian Shide set for S.League bow
 Dalian Shide to field team in S.League
 实德俱乐部进军新加坡联赛
 大连实德加盟 新联赛更好看
 新加坡职业足球联赛新星 大连实德保证 让球迷感受到专业
 大连实德四五队　要扬威新联赛

Dalian Shide F.C.
Foreign teams in Singapore football leagues
Expatriated football clubs
2008 establishments in Singapore
Singapore Premier League clubs